Vatazhka is a rural locality (a selo) in Marfinsky Selsoviet of Volodarsky District, Astrakhan Oblast, Russia. The population was 172 as of 2010. There are 4 streets.

Geography 
Vatazhka is located 19 km east of Volodarsky (the district's administrative centre) by road. Marfino is the nearest rural locality.

References 

Rural localities in Volodarsky District, Astrakhan Oblast